Mark Lesly (April 19, 1959, in Manhattan, New York) appeared in the credits of The Wanderers. He later served on the Bernie Goetz jury and wrote a book about it called Subway Gunman.

Biography 

Mark Lesly grew up in Hastings-on-Hudson, New York, and was involved with both Taekwondo and acting. While studying acting at New York University, he was cast as a Ducky Boy in The Wanderers.

He apprenticed with The Bond Street Theatre Coalition, then formed his own street theater company, Questers & Jesters, with J. David Brimmer and Beverly Branum, performed Shakespeare (Kings County Shakespeare Company, Actors Classical Troupe), wrote, produced and acted in his own plays (Clockworks Theatre) and paid his bills by becoming a Taekwondo teacher.

A student of the legendary Grand Master Dong Keun Park (undefeated Korean Champion and Head Coach of the USA Olympic Taekwondo Team at the Barcelona Olympics in 1992), he founded the NYU Sport Taekwondo Club in 1987, and continues to serve as the team's Head Coach.  He is currently an 8th Dan Black Belt, certified by the World Taekwondo Headquarters (Kukkiwon) in South Korea, and recently received his 9th Dan from the Jidokwan, one of the original Kwans of Taekwondo, which makes him officially a Grand Master in Taekwondo. GM Lesly was the USA Taekwondo Forms Champion for 4th Degree Black Belts and higher in 1996 after winning the Silver Medal in 1995. At different times he has served as the Northeast Regional Director for the National Collegiate Taekwondo Association, as Vice President of the National Association of State Taekwondo Organizations and as Vice President of the NJ State Taekwondo Association.  He was a Member of the Board of the East Coast Taekwondo Conference (formerly known as the Ivy/Northeast Collegiate Taekwondo League) from its founding in 1991 until he retired from the position in 2004.  In 2016, GM Lesly was selected to be the Chair for Maccabi USA Taekwondo, and his team won five bronze medals in the 2017 World Maccabi Games held in Israel. In 2018 he became the Chairman of Jewish American Taekwondo, a 501(c)(3) non-profit to raise funds to support Jewish athletes.  He has trained over one hundred students to the rank of Black Belt and beyond, including Master Albert Lee (6th Dan), who coached the NYU Team for 8 years, and Master Andre Chi (5th Dan).

After serving on the Bernie Goetz jury, he participated in talk shows, most notably Larry King and Phil Donahue's. He also wrote a book based on his experience as a juror and explains how the jury came to its decision. Goetz cites Lesly's book on Goetz' eccentric website, as the source of accurate information about the incident. Lesly recently filmed interviews for documentaries on the Goetz Trial by both Fox News and Netflix.

Lesly formerly taught 7th & 8th Grade language arts at Queen City Academy Charter School in Plainfield, 6th Grade at the John L. Costley Middle School in East Orange, 11th & 12th Grade at The Great Falls Academy HS in Paterson, and is currently teaching 6th, 7th and 8th Grade English at Yeshiva Ktana in Passaic.  He is certified both as a K-12 Language Arts and K-12 Theater Teacher in New Jersey.  He is married to the former Leslie Klouser and has one son, Jalen, who was born in 1998.

References

External links 

1959 births
Living people
American male film actors
20th-century American male actors
People from Hastings-on-Hudson, New York
Male actors from New York (state)